The 2018 Chinese U-19 Super League is the 1st season since the establishment of the Chinese Youth Super League in 2017. It replaces the Elite U-19 League.

Division A

League table

Division B

League table

Notes

References

1